Rosewater is a 2016 science fiction novel by Nigerian-British writer Tade Thompson. In Rosewater, Nigerian agent Kaaro uses his psychic powers to investigate a mysterious alien dome and deaths linked to it. It was followed by two sequels: The Rosewater Insurrection and The Rosewater Redemption which were published in 2019 simultaneously. The novel won the inaugural Nommo Award as well as the 2019 Arthur C. Clarke Award.

Plot

In 2012, an alien named Wormwood appears in London, substantially altering the world's geopolitical landscape. In the 2050s, it creates an impenetrable dome in Rosewater, Nigeria. It exudes a fungus which interacts with human nervous systems, granting psychic powers to some human “sensitives”. The life of Kaaro, a sensitive, is presented throughout different decades.

As a teen, Kaaro uses his burgeoning psychic abilities for thievery. He is caught and almost executed. He escapes and begins using his telepathy on the black market before being recruited by the government. In the 2050s, he trains with S45, a secret branch of the Nigerian government. He is tasked with tracking down Oyin Da, an anarchist revolutionary. Kaaro and Da travel to the future site of Rosewater, where they speak with Wormwood. They are followed by S45 agents who shoot at Wormwood, but Kaaro senses the trap and saves him. Wormwood then creates the dome to separate himself from most humans; Da stays within the dome and Kaaro does not.

In 2066, Kaaro is still working for S45. Sensitives begin dying of an unknown illness. He begins seeing a mysterious woman named Molara in the xenosphere. He dates a woman named Aminat. Unbeknownst to Kaaro, she is an undercover S45 agent. Molara reveals that she is an alien. The creation of sensitives was an unintended consequence as the aliens gathered information about Earth. They no longer need more information, so they are killing the sensitives. She attempts to kill Kaaro, but he is rescued by Wormwood. Kaaro learns that the aliens are replacing human DNA with their own over the course of generations. He and Aminat continue their lives, unsure about how to combat the inevitable end of humanity.

Major themes

After Wormwood lands in London, the United States goes dark and becomes isolated from the world. In contrast, Nigeria becomes the center of the story. This contrasts with the history of science fiction, a genre long dominated by Americans, and mirrors the emergence of more science fiction writers of African descent. The novel also critiques the isolationist policies of former American president Donald Trump.

The novel features important discussions about human connection. This is shown by the presence of sensitives and their ability to access the xenosphere, which parallels the inability of many modern people to disconnect from the Internet and social media. In contrast to white western cyberpunk, Rosewater'''s characters are connected by networks of family and friendship groups. Homosexuality is still illegal in 2060s Nigeria; Kaaro's gay foster parents are forced to disable their tracking signals despite the presence of an all-connecting xenosphere. Furthermore, the alien invasion trope is used to explore "global power structures and pervasive technologies".

Publication history

The novel was first published by the small press Apex Publications before being acquired by Orbit Books.

Reception

The novel received critical praise. It has been described as a genre mashup, including Africanfuturism, cyberpunk, biopunk, Afropunk, zombie-shocker, a love story; a reviewer for The Guardian praised Thompson's ability to "expertly [juggle] all his disparate elements". Another reviewer called it "a worthy winner" of the Arthur C. Clarke Award and stated that Thompson was one of the "leading proponents of contemporary Afrofuturism" along with authors such as N.K. Jemisin and Colson Whitehead. The novel was praised for including various references to Yoruba culture. A reviewer for Locus'' wrote that it "represent[s] yet another major contribution to the small but growing number of SF works reflecting Nigerian culture." Another praised the "evocative descriptions" as well as the physicality of the writing style. Thompson also received praise for his strong female characters.

The novel won the inaugural 2017 Nommo Award for Best Novel and the 2019 Arthur C. Clarke Award, and, with its two sequels, was a finalist for the 2020 Hugo Award for Best Series.

References

Nigerian science fiction novels
2016 science fiction novels
Fiction set in 2066
Science fiction books
Alien invasions in novels
Africanfuturist novels
Novels set in Nigeria
2016 British novels
2016 Nigerian novels
Science fiction novel series
Novels about alien visitations
Alternate history novels